Frazier Mountain (Samala: Toshololo) is a broad, pine-forested peak in the Transverse Ranges System, within the Los Padres National Forest in northeastern Ventura County, California. At , Frazier Mnt. is the sixteenth-highest mountain in the Transverse Ranges of Southern California.

Etymology
Frazier Mountain is named after the American miner William T. Frazer, who worked in the area in the 1850s, with a spelling alteration.

To the Chumash people, Frazier Mountain is called Toshololo. In the Samala language it means "mountain of the east", referring to is location east of Iwihinmu (Mount Pinos) and cosmological associations with the morning star and the spring equinox. The mountain is considered sacred to the Chumash people as it is an important part of their history and culture.

Geography

The community of Frazier Park and its outlying district of Lake of the Woods are northward of the mountain. The intersection of Ventura, Los Angeles, and Kern Counties lies just to the northeast. Interstate 5 runs to the east of the mountain, and Southern California Edison's Path 26 500 kV wires are at its eastern foothills.

Mount Pinos is 21.5 miles by road west of Frazier Mountain. Alamo Mountain and the Sespe Condor Sanctuary are to its south.

The summit of the mountain is a Forest Service lookout area with radio tower facilities as well as an abandoned fire lookout tower. The highest point is accessible by a forest road that is open when there is no snow present on the mountain.

See also
 
 1857 Fort Tejon earthquake — nearby on the San Andreas fault.

References

External links 

 
 

Transverse Ranges
Mountains of Ventura County, California
Los Padres National Forest
Mt. Pinos Ranger District, Los Padres National Forest
Mountains of Southern California